Cortobenzolone (brand name Tuplix), also known as betamethasone salicylate, is a synthetic glucocorticoid corticosteroid and corticosteroid ester which is marketed in Spain.

References

Corticosteroid esters
Organofluorides
Glucocorticoids
Pregnanes
Prodrugs
Salicylate esters
Tetrols
3-Hydroxypropenals